Nenad Dizdarević (born 21 May 1955) is a film director, screenwriter, producer, and teacher of cinema from Sarajevo, Bosnia and Herzegovina.  His most notable film, Magarece godine (1994), was the Bosnian submission to the Academy Awards in 1995. He is the co-founder of the Sarajevo Academy of Arts.

Awards and honors
Dizdarević received a Golden Palm in 1994 for Magarece godine at the Valencia Festival of Mediterranean Cinema.

Filmography

References

External links

1955 births
Living people
Film people from Sarajevo
Bosnia and Herzegovina film directors
Bosnia and Herzegovina screenwriters
Male screenwriters
Bosnia and Herzegovina film producers
Bosnia and Herzegovina male writers